Mario Mazzola is the former senior vice president and current chief development officer at Cisco Systems, Inc. He began working for Cisco Systems in 1993. He is a graduate of the University of Bologna.

References

University of Bologna alumni
Cisco people
Living people
Year of birth missing (living people)